Stsiapan Valeryevich Rahautsou (born 29 May 1986) is a Belarusian long-distance runner. At the 2012 Summer Olympics, he competed in the Men's marathon, finishing in 64th place.

References

1986 births
Living people
Belarusian male long-distance runners
Belarusian male marathon runners
Olympic athletes of Belarus
Athletes (track and field) at the 2012 Summer Olympics
People from Byalynichy District
Olympic male marathon runners
Sportspeople from Mogilev Region